Nordseter is a mountain cross country skiing area located 14 km from Lillehammer in Norway, not very far from Sjusjøen. The area is located at an altitude of approx. 850 meters above sea level, and offers skiing in the months from December through to the end of March. In the summers, the area is also popular for the locals and a growing number of tourists with many activities such as walking, kayaking, cycling, small game hunting and fishing.

The area has been used for centuries as summer farms where the local farmers would take advantage of the thaw and take their animals into the lush mountainside to feed. In the early nineteen hundreds the first guest houses began to appear to entertain tourists and travellers.

References

Sport in Hedmark
Ski areas and resorts in Norway